La Tour-d'Aigues is a commune in the Vaucluse department in the Provence-Alpes-Côte d'Azur region in southeastern France.

Geography
It is the capital town of the Pays d'Aigues.

Climate
La Tour d'Aigues is under the influence of the mediterranean climate characterised by hot and dry summers and mild winters.

History

Middle Ages

The town belonged to the counts of Forcalquier until the end of the 12th century, when it passed to the Sabran family through marriage, and later to the Agoults.

La Tour d'Aigues was partly destroyed in 1390 when facing the assault of Raymond VIII de Turenne. In addition to this, epidemics emptied the town of its population. This crisis allowed Fouquet d'Agoult to acquire new territories: le Tourel, la Bastidonne, Saint-Martin-de-la-Brasque and Cabrière d'Aigues.

The Templars also had an establishment at La Tour d'Aigues.

Renaissance

Raymond d'Agoult, Fouquet d'Agoult's son, died without an heir in 1505. His sister Jeanne, wife of Antoine de Bolliers, viscount of Reillane, inherited La Tour d'Aigues. They brought farmers from their lands in Piémont to enrich the land. The town then passed on to the d'Agoult de Sault in 1584. It then belonged to the Lesdiguières, to a certain Villeroy in 1617, and, finally, to the Brunys in 1719 who were unpopular rich merchants from Marseille.

La Tour d'Aigues faced a devastating plague in 1630 and 1631.

Early Modern Period

When the Villeroys went bankrupt, they were forced to sell the Renaissance castle built by Nicolas de Bolliers in 1550 to Jean-Baptiste Bruny. His son, Jérôme Bruny, turned the castle into a museum.

Culture

Museums and sights
Parc naturel régional du Luberon
The Renaissance castle, entirely renovated in the 16th and 17th century. It burnt down before the French Revolution. Catherine de Médicis is said to have visited it in 1579.
The Eglise Notre-Dame de Romégas which dates back to the 13th century.
The Maison d'Estienne du Bourguet built from 1658 to 1671 with 17th-century murals.
The Museum of earthenware in the cellars of the castle.

Notable people 
Victor d'Hupay

See also
Côtes du Luberon AOC
Communes of the Vaucluse department
Luberon

References

Communes of Vaucluse